Ikaw Pa Lang ang Minahal is a 1992 Filipino drama film directed by Carlos Siguion-Reyna and produced by Armida Siguion-Reyna. The screenplay by Raquel Villavicencio is based on the 1949 drama film The Heiress, itself an adaptation of Henry James' 1880 novel Washington Square, directed by William Wyler and starring Olivia de Havilland and Montgomery Clift. Ikaw Pa Lang ang Minahal stars Maricel Soriano as Adela, the sheltered daughter of a renowned doctor, played by Eddie Gutierrez. Richard Gomez stars as her suitor, David.

The film was the second production of Reyna Films, after Hihintayin Kita sa Langit, reuniting director Siguion-Reyna with screenwriter Villavicencio and actor Gomez. In 2018, the film was digitally restored and remastered by the ABS-CBN Film Restoration Project and Central Digital Lab, Inc.

Plot 
Adela (Maricel Soriano) is a plain and pitifully awkward young woman whose father, the emotionally detached Maximo (Eddie Gutierrez), makes no secret how disappointed he is that she is nothing like his late wife (Dawn Zulueta), who died in childbirth. Despite his verbal and emotional mistreatment of her, Adela remains devoted to her father. Her widowed aunt Paula (Charito Solis) moves in with them and soon attempts to show Adela the world beyond their mansion.

At a wedding party, Adela embarrasses herself while attempting to dance, then runs and hides in the garden. There she meets the handsome and debonair David (Richard Gomez). He reveals that he knows who she is, saying he asked his friends who she was after seeing her from afar. David soon begins courting Adela, who has never received such care and affection, with Paula encouraging them. Maximo, however, is immediately suspicious of David's intentions. Over dinner, David confesses that he has never worked a day in his life, and used up his inheritance on travel, but insists that he is there because he is ready to settle down and start a family. Maximo tells Paula that he thinks David is only after Adela for her money. He feels his suspicions are confirmed after a frank discussion with David's sister Caridad (Armida Siguion-Reyna), who received no share of the inheritance from David despite being a widowed mother of five.

When David asks Maximo for his daughter's hand in marriage, Maximo gives the suitor a check to stay away from Adela. David refuses to accept the check, exclaiming he loves Adela. In order to test David's love for his daughter, Maximo separates the young couple for six months by taking Adela on a trip to the United States. When the father and daughter return, Adela is elated to learn from Paula that David has been steadfast in his love for her during their time apart. How Maximo takes the news, however, is that David had been visiting Paula at Maximo's home and treating the mansion like his own personal club house while they were away.

Adela and David make plans to elope. Maximo overhears them and over an abusive tirade tells Adela that David could only love her for her money as she possess no qualities any man could find attractive. When Adela and David see each other again, Adela says that she does not want to rely on her father anymore and affirms her resolve to elope. On the night of the planned elopement, David fails to show up. Adela runs to Caridad's house and learns that David has already left after borrowing money from his sister to go to Manila. Spurned by the man she loves, Adela grows cold, talks back to her father, and leaves his home.

Years later, Maximo is dying. Adela, with her child Jenny, returns to her father's home claiming she is there only to secure her inheritance. On Maximo's deathbed, over a tense and emotional exchange, the father and daughter reconcile. Soon after, Maximo dies. Adela is visited by David, who asks for her forgiveness, saying that he left because he cared for Adela so much that he could not let her be disinherited because of him. Falling for David's promise to dedicate his life to Adela and Jenny's happiness, the couple rekindle their former romance and begin planning their wedding. 

However, Adela sees David so comfortably drinking her father's liquor and acting out as if master of the house already. She realizes that her father's suspicions were right all along. She also gave David a pair of cufflinks, made of gold and pearls, and wanted it to wear these on their wedding day. These were bought by Adela while she and her father were in the United States. Adela also wanted make a document that would inherit all of her wealth to Jenny. But David told her that she's still young to inherit such wealth, but Adela insisted that it's for her future. David used the cufflinks as payment for his debts. It found out that David would loan money that was used in gambling especially cockfighting. On the day of the wedding, Adela, arriving late to the altar and not wearing her wedding gown, confronts David in front of their guests. She declares that she will only be seeking her own happiness from then on without depending on anyone else. Adela throws bills of money at David before getting into a car and hugging her daughter.

Cast

Production
The role of Adela was originally offered to Vilma Santos, who initially accepted but had to pull out due to scheduling conflicts after shooting on the Regal Films production Sinungaling Mong Puso was delayed. Producer Armida Siguion-Reyna then offered the role to Maricel Soriano.

The film was shot at the Escudero family estate in Tiaong, Quezon.

Music
The film's musical score was composed by Ryan Cayabyab. The film's theme song "Kahit Na" was performed by singer Rachel Alejandro, with words and music by Willy Cruz and arrangement by Ryan Cayabyab.

Release
The film was released on June 5, 1992, by its distributor Bonanza Films on 55 theaters across the Metro Manila region and its neighboring provinces of Rizal and Bulacan. It became a financial success for Reyna Films.

Digital restoration
In 2018, the film was digitally restored and remastered by the ABS-CBN Film Restoration Project and Central Digital Lab, Inc. The restoration was done by scanning the film in 4K resolution and restoring in 2K resolution. The film elements supplied by Reyna Films included the master picture negative and the sound negative. During the film's restoration process, the most prevalent damages found in the supplied material were bumps, splice marks, image instabilities, and molds. The image instability posed a big challenge and required the most number of restoration hours. The other damages include heavy black debris, grain, flicker, color shift, and missing frames.

The restored version premiered on April 18, 2018, at Trinoma mall in Quezon City, opening the "Cinema Classics" series.

Television broadcast
The restored version received its free-to-air television premier on ABS-CBN on February 16, 2020, as a feature presentation for the network's Sunday's Best program. The showing attained a nationwide rating of 1.3%, losing to GMA Network's showing of the 2006 film Blue Moon which attained a rating of 2.6%.

Reception

Accolades

References

Notes

External links

1992 films
1992 drama films
Philippine drama films
Filipino-language films
Films directed by Carlos Siguion-Reyna